This is a list of state leaders in the 14th century (1301–1400) AD, except for the many leaders within the Holy Roman Empire.

Africa

Africa: Central

Angola

Kingdom of Kongo: Kilukeni (complete list) –
Lukeni lua Nimi, Manikongo (1390s)

Cameroon

Kingdom of Bamum (complete list) –
Nchare Yen, Mfon (1394–1418)

Chad

Kanem Empire (Kanem–Bornu) (complete list) –
Ibrahim I, Mai (1290–1310)
Abdullah II, Mai (1310–1328)
Salmama II, Mai (1328–1332)
Kuri I, Mai (1332–1333)
Kuri II, Mai (1334–1335)
Muhammad I, Mai (1334–1335)
Idris I, Mai (1335–1359)
Dawud, Mai (1359–1369)
Othman I, Mai (1369–1373)
Othman II, Mai (1373–1375)
Abu Bakr Liyatu, Mai (1375–1376)
Omar I, Mai (1376–1381)
To the Bornu Empire in West Africa

Africa: East

Great Lakes area

Uganda

Buganda (complete list) –
Kato Kintu, Kabaka (early 14th century)
Chwa I, Kabaka (mid-14th century)
Kimera, Kabaka (c.1374–c.1404)

Horn of Africa area

Ethiopia

Ethiopian Empire: Solomonic dynasty (complete list) –
Wedem Arad, Emperor (1299–1314)
Amda Seyon I, Emperor (1314–1344)
Newaya Krestos, Emperor (1344–1372)
Newaya Maryam, Emperor (1372–1382)
Dawit I, Emperor (1382–1413)
Kingdom of Kaffa (complete list) –
Minjo, King (c.1390)

Somalia

Sultanate of Ifat: Walashma dynasty (complete list) –
Zubēr Abūd, Sultan (13th–14th century)
Layla Abūd, Māti (14th century)
Haqq ad-Din I, Sultan (?–1328)
Sabr ad-Din I, Sultan (1328–1332)
Jamal ad-Din I, Sultan (1332–?)
NasradDīn Naḥwi, Sultan (14th century)
Ali ibn Sabr ad-Din, Sultan (14th century)
Ahmad ibn Ali, Sultan (14th century)
Haqq ad-Din II, Sultan (?–1374)
Sa'ad ad-Din II, Sultan (1374–1403)

Warsangali Sultanate –
Garaad Dhidhin, Sultan (1298–1311)
Garaad Hamar Gale, Sultan (1311–1328)
Garaad Ibrahim, Sultan (1328–1340)
Garaad Omer, Sultan (1340–1355)
Garaad Mohamud I, Sultan (1355–1375)
Garaad Ciise I, Sultan (1375–1392)
Garaad Siciid, Sultan (1392–1409)

Africa: Northeast

Egypt

Abbasid Caliphate, Cairo (complete list) –
al-Hakim I, Caliph (1262–1302)
al-Mustakfi I, Caliph (1303–1340)
al-Wathiq I, Caliph (1340–1341)
al-Hakim II, Caliph (1341–1352)
al-Mu'tadid I, Caliph (1352–1362)
al-Mutawakkil I, Caliph (1362–1377, 1377–1383, 1389–1406)
al-Musta'sim, Caliph (1377, 1386–1389)
al-Wathiq II, Caliph (1383–1386)

Mamluk Sultanate (complete list) –
Bahri dynasty
Al-Nasir Muhammad, Sultan (1299–1309)
Baibars II, Sultan (1309–1310)
Al-Nasir Muhammad, Sultan (1310–1341)
Al-Mansur Abu Bakr, Sultan (1341)
Al-Ashraf Kujuk, Sultan (1341–1342)
An-Nasir Ahmad, Sultan (1342)
As-Salih Ismail, Sultan (1342–1345)
Al-Kamil Sha'ban, Sultan (1345–1346)
Al-Muzaffar Hajji, Sultan (1346–1347)
An-Nasir Hasan, Sultan (1347–1351)
As-Salih Salih, Sultan (1351–1354)
An-Nasir Hasan, Sultan (1354–1361)
Al-Mansur Muhammad, Sultan (1361–1363)
Al-Ashraf Sha'ban, Sultan (1363–1377)
Al-Mansur Ali II, Sultan (1377–1381)
As-Salih Hajji, Sultan (1381–1382)
Burji dynasty
Barquq, Sultan (1382–1389)
As-Salih Hajji, Sultan (1389–1390)
Barquq, Sultan (1390–1399)
An-Nasir Faraj, Sultan (1399–1405)

Sudan
Makuria (complete list) –
Ayay, King (c.1304/5)
Kernabes, King (1311–1316)
Barschanbu, King (1316–1317)
Kanz ed-Dawla, King (c.1317)
Kernabes, King (1323–1324)
Banu Kanz, King (c.1324)
al-Amir Abi Abdallah Kanz el-Dawla, King (1333)

Africa: Northcentral

Tunisia

Hafsid dynasty (complete list) –
Muhammad I, Khalif (1295–1309)
Abu Bakr I, Khalif (1309)
Aba al-Baqa Khalid an-Nasir, Khalif (1309–1311)
Aba Yahya Zakariya al-Lihyani, Khalif (1311–1317)
Muhammad II, Khalif (1317–1318)
Abu Bakr II, Khalif (1318–1346)
Abu Hafs Umar II, Khalif (1346–1349)
Ahmad I, Khalif (1349)
Ishaq II, Khalif (1350–1369)
Abu al-Baqa Khalid, Khalif (1369–1371)
Ahmad II, Khalif (1371–1394)
Abd al-Aziz II, Khalif (1394–1434)

Africa: Northwest

Morocco

Marinid dynasty of Morocco (complete list) –
Abu Yaqub Yusuf an-Nasr, Sultan (1286–1307)
Abu Thabit Amir, Sultan (1307–1308)
Abu al-Rabi Sulayman, Sultan (1308–1310)
Abu Sa'id Uthman II, Sultan (1310–1331)
Abu al-Hassan Ali, Sultan (1331–1351)
Abu Inan Faris, Sultan (1348–1358)
Muhammad ibn Faris, Sultan (1358, 1362–1366)
Abu Bakr ibn Faris, Sultan (1358–1359)
Ibrahim ibn Ali, Sultan (1359–1361)
Tashfin ibn Ali, Sultan (1361–1362)
Muhammad ibn Faris, Sultan (1358, 1362–1366)
Abu Faris Abdul Aziz I, Sultan (1366–1372)
Muhammad III ibn Abd al-Aziz, Sultan (1372–1374)
Abu'l-Abbas Ahmad al-Mustansir, Sultan (1374–1384, 1387–1393)
Musa ibn Faris al-Mutawakkil, Sultan (1384–1386)
Muhammad ibn Ahmad al-Wathiq, Sultan (1386–1387)
Abu'l-Abbas Ahmad al-Mustansir, Sultan (1374–1384, 1387–1393)
Abd al-Aziz II ibn Ahmad II, Sultan (1393–1396)
Abdallah ibn Ahmad II, Sultan (1396–1398)
Abu Said Uthman III, Sultan (1398–1420)

Africa: South

Angola

Kingdom of Ndongo (complete list) –
as BaKongo tributary
a-Nzinga, Ngola (c.1358)

Africa: West

Benin

Kingdom of Benin (complete list) –
Udagbedo, Oba (1292–1329)
Ohen, Oba (1329–1366)
Egbeka, Oba (1366–1397)
Orobiru, Oba (1397–1434)

Burkina Faso

Mossi Kingdom of Nungu (complete list) –
Untani, Nunbado (1292–1336)
Banydoba, Nunbado (1336–1380)
Labi Diebo, Nunbado (1380–1395)
Tenin, Nunbado (1395–1425)

Mali

Mali Empire: Keita dynasty (complete list) –
Gao, Mansa (1300–1305)
Mohammed ibn Gao, Mansa (1305–1310)
Abu Bakr II, Mansa (1310–1312)
Musa I, Mansa (1312–1337)
Maghan I, Mansa (1337–1341)
Suleyman, Mansa (1341–1360)
Kassa, Mansa (1360)
Mari Djata II of Mali, Mansa (1360–1374)
Musa II of Mali, Mansa (1374–1387)
Maghan II, Mansa (1387–1389)
Sandaki, Mansa (1389–1390)
Maghan III, Mansa (1390–1400)
Musa III, Mansa (1400–c.1440)

Nigeria

Bornu Empire (Kanem–Bornu) (complete list) –
From the Kanem Empire in Central Africa
Said, Mai (1381–1382)
Kaday II, Mai (1382–1383)
Bir III, Mai (1383–1415)

Oyo Empire (complete list) –
Oranyan, Alaafin (c.1300–?)
Ajaka, Alaafin (14th century)
Shango, Alaafin (14th century)
Ajaka, Alaafin (14th century)
Aganju, Alaafin (?–c.1400)

Kingdom/Sultanate of Kano (complete list) –
Shekarau, King (1290–1307)
Tsamiya, King (1307–1343)
Usmanu Zamnagawa, King (1343–1349)
Yaji I, King/Sultan (1349–1385)
Bugaya, Sultan (1385–1390)
Kanejeji, Sultan (1390–1410)
Kingdom of Nri (complete list) –
Eze Nri Jiọfọ I, King (1300–1390)
Eze Nri Ọmalonyeso, King (1391–1464)

Senegal

Jolof / Wolof Empire (complete list) –
N'Dyadya N'Dyaye, Buur-ba (1350–1370)
Sare N'Dyaye, Buur-ba (1370–1390)
N'Diklam Sare, Buur-ba (1390–1420)

Americas

Americas: North

Mexico

Azcapotzalco –
Tezozomoc I, Tlatoani (1331)
Aculnahuacatl, Tlatoani (c.1302–c.1367)
Tezozomoc, Tlatoani (1353/71–1426)

Cuernavaca –
Macuilxochitl, Tlatoani (1365)
Tezcacohuatzin / Ozomatzinteuctli, Tlatoani (1365)

Tarascan state (complete list) –
Tariácuri, Cazonci (c.1300–c.1350)
Hiquingaje, Cazonci (c.1350–?)

Tenochtitlan (complete list) —
under the Tepanec suzerainty
Acamapichtli, Tlatoani (1375–1395)
Huitzilihuitl, Tlatoani (1395-c. 1417)

Tepanec –
Tetzotzomoc, Tlatoani (1367–1426)

Zapotec civilization –
Zaachila –
Zaachila Yoo, King (1386–1415)

Americas: South

Colombia

Muisca Confederation
Zaque (complete list) –
Hunzahúa, Zaque (?–1470)
Michuá, Zaque (1470–1490)
Quemuenchatocha, Zaque (1490–1537)
Zipa (complete list) –
Meicuchuca, Zipa (1450–1470)
Saguamanchica, Zipa (1470–1490)
Nemequene, Zipa (1490–1514)

Peru

Kingdom of Cusco (complete list) –
Mayta Cápac, Inca (c.1290–1320)
Cápac Yupanqui, Inca (c.1320–1350)
Roca, Inca (c.1350–1380)
Yawar Waqaq, Inca (c.1380–1410)

Asia

Asia: Central

Kazakhstan

Chagatai Khanate (complete list) –
Duwa, Khan (1287–1307)
Könchek, Khan (1306–1308)
Taliqu, Khan (1308–1309)
Esen Buqa I, Khan (1309–c.1318)
Kebek, Khan (1309, c.1318–1325)
Eljigidey, Khan (1325–1329)
Duwa Temür, Khan (1329–1330)
Tarmashirin, Khan (1331–1334)
Buzan, Khan (1334–1335)
Changshi, Khan (1335–1338)
Yesun Temur, Khan (c.1338–c.1342)
'Ali-Sultan, Khan (1342)
Muhammad I ibn Pulad, Khan (1342–1343)
Qazan ibn Yasaur, Khan (1343–1346)
Danishmendji, Khan (1346–1348)
Tughlugh Timur, Khan of Eastern Chagatai (c.1347–1363), Khan of Western Chagatai (c.1360–1363)

Western Chagatai Khanate (complete list) –
Bayan Qulï, Khan (1348–1358)
Shah Temur, Khan (1358)
Tughlugh Timur, Khan of Eastern and Western Chagatai (c.1360–1363)
Adil-Sultan, Khan (1363)
Khabul Shah, Khan (1364–1370)
From 1370 on, the Chagatai Khans were puppets of Timur
Soyurghatmïsh Khan, Khan (1370–1384)
Mahmud, Khan (1384–1402)

Moghulistan, Eastern Chagatai Khanate (complete list) –
Tughlugh Timur, Khan (c.1347–1363)
Ilyas Khoja, Khan (1363–1368)
Qamar-ud-din Khan Dughlat, Khan (1368–1392)
Khizr Khoja, Khan (1389–1399)
Shams-i-Jahan, Khan (1399–1408)

Kara Del
Unaširi, Khan (1380–1393)
Engke Temür, Khan (1393–1405)

Mongolia

Mongol Empire (complete list) –
Temür, Khan / Emperor (1294–1307)

Russia

Golden Horde (complete list) –
Toqta, Khan (1291—1312)
Uzbeg Khan, Khan (1312–1341)
Tini Beg, Khan (1341–1342)
Jani Beg, Khan (1342—1357)
Berdi Beg, Khan (1357—1361)
Qulpa, Khan (1359–1360)
Nawruz Beg, Khan (1360–1361)
Khidr, Khan (1361–1362)
Timur Khwaja, Khan (1362)
Abdallah, Khan (1362–1370)
Murad, Khan (1362–1367)
Aziz, Khan (1367–1369)
Jani Beg II, Khan (1369–1370)
Muhammad Bolak, Khan (1370–1379)
Tulun Beg Khanum, Regent (1370–1373)
Aig Beg, Khan (1373–1376)
Arab Shaykh, Khan (1376–1379)
Kagan Beg, Khan (1375–1376)
Ilbani, Khan (1373–1376)
Hajji Cherkes, Khan (1375–1376)
Urus Khan, Khan (1376–1378)
Freky Aziz Reffelruz, Khan (1378–1380)
Tokhtamysh, Khan (1380–1395)
Temür Qutlugh, Khan (1396–1401)
Shadi Beg, Khan (1399–1407)

White Horde (complete list) –
Köchü, Khan (c.1280–1302)
Buyan (Bayan), Khan (1302–1309)
Sasibuqa, Khan (1309–1315)
Ilbasan, Khan (1315–1320)
Mubarak Khwaja, Khan (1320–1344)
Chimtay, Khan (1344–1374)
Urus, Khan (1374–1376)
Toqtaqiya, Khan (1376)
Timur-Malik, Khan (1377)
Tokhtamysh, Khan (1377–1378)
Koiruchik, Khan (1378–1399)

Blue Horde (complete list) –
Toqta, Khan (1291—1312)
Öz Beg Khan, Khan (1312–1341)
Tini Beg, Khan (1341–1342)
Jani Beg, Khan (1342—1357)
Berdi Beg, Khan (1357—1361)
Qulpa, Khan (1359–1360)
Nawruz Beg, Khan (1360–1361)
Khidr, Khan (1361–1362)
Timur Khwaja, Khan (1362)
Abdallah, Khan (1362–1370)

Siberia

Khanate of Sibir (complete list) –
Khoja bin Taibugha, Khan (?)
Tokhtamysh, Khan (1396–1406)

Tibet

Guge
rNam rgyal lde, King (1396?–1424)

Phagmodrupa dynasty (complete list) –
Tai Situ Changchub Gyaltsen, Monarch (1354–1364)
Jamyang Shakya Gyaltsen, Monarch (1364–1373)
Drakpa Changchub, Monarch (1374–1381)
Sonam Drakpa, Monarch (1381–1385)
Drakpa Gyaltsen, Monarch (1385–1432)

Asia: East

China: Yuan dynasty

Yuan dynasty (complete list) –
Temür, Khan / Emperor (1294–1307)
Külüg, Khan / Emperor (1307–1311)
Ayurbarwada Buyantu, Khan / Emperor (1311–1320)
Gegeen, Khan / Emperor (1320–1323)
Yesün-Temür, Khan / Emperor (1323–1328)
Ragibagh, Khan / Emperor (1328)
Jayaatu Tugh Temür, Khan / Emperor (1328–1329, 1329–1332)
Khutughtu Kusala, Khan / Emperor (1329)
Rinchinbal, Khan / Emperor (1332)
Toghon Temür, Khan / Emperor (1333–1368), Emperor of the Northern Yuan (1368–1370)

China: Ming dynasty

Ming dynasty (complete list) –
Hongwu, Prince (1364–1368), Emperor (1368–1398)
Jianwen, Emperor (1398–1402)

Japan: Main

Kamakura shogunate of Japan
Emperors (complete list) –
Go-Fushimi, Emperor (1298–1301)
Go-Nijō, Emperor (1301–1308)
Hanazono, Emperor (1308–1318)
Go-Daigo, Emperor (1318–1339)
Shōguns (complete list) –
Prince Hisaaki, Shōgun (1289–1308)
Prince Morikuni, Shōgun (1308–1333)
Regent of the shogunate (complete list) –
Hōjō Sadatoki, Shikken (1284–1301)
Hōjō Morotoki, Shikken (1301–1311)
Hōjō Takatoki, Shikken (1316–1326)

Kenmu Restoration (complete list) –
Kōgon, Emperor (1331–1333)
Kōmyō, Emperor (1336–1348)
Sukō, Emperor (1348–1351)
Go-Kōgon, Emperor (1352–1371)
Go-En'yū, Emperor (1371–1382)
Go-Komatsu, Emperor (1382–1392)

Ashikaga shogunate of Japan
Emperors (complete list) –
Go-Daigo, Emperor (1318–1339)
Go-Murakami, Emperor (1339–1368)
Chōkei, Emperor (1368–1383)
Go-Kameyama, Emperor (1383–1392)
Go-Komatsu, Emperor (1392–1412)
Shōguns –
Takauji, Shōgun (1338–1358)
Yoshiakira, Shōgun (1358–1367)
Yoshimitsu, Shōgun (1367–1395)
Yoshimochi, Shōgun (1395–1423)

Japan: Ryukyu Kingdoms

Ryukyu Kingdom: Eiso Dynasty –
Taisei, Chief (1300–1308)
Eiji, Chief (1309–1313)
Tamagusuku, Chief (1314–1336)
Seii, Chief (1337–1354)

Chūzan: Ryukyu Kingdoms of the Sanzan period –
Tributary state of the Ming dynasty
Satto, Chief (1355–1397)
Bunei, Chief (1398–1406)

Nanzan: Ryukyu Kingdoms of the Sanzan period –
Tributary state of the Ming dynasty
Ofusato, Chief (1337–1396)
Oueishi, Chief (1388–1402)

Hokuzan: Ryukyu Kingdoms of the Sanzan period –
Tributary state of the Ming dynasty
Haniji, Chief (1322–1395)
Min, Chief (1396–1400)

Korea

Goryeo (complete list) –
Chungnyeol, King (1274–1298, 1298–1308)
Chungseon, King (1298, 1308–1313)
Chungsuk, King (1313–1330, 1332–1339)
Chunghye, King (1330–1332, 1339–1344)
Chungmok, King (1344–1348)
Chungjeong, King (1348–1351)
Gongmin, King (1351–1374)
U, King (1374–1388)
Chang, King (1388–1389)
Gongyang, King (1389–1392)

Joseon (complete list) –
Taejo, King (1392–1398)
Jeongjong, King (1398–1400)
Taejong, King (1400–1418)

Mongolia

Alliance of the Four Oirat (complete list) –
Mönkhtömör, leader (c. 1368–1390s)
Örüg Temür Khan, leader (c. 1399)
Batula, leader (1399–1408)

Northern Yuan dynasty (complete list) –
Toghon Temür, Khan / Emperor (1333–1368), Emperor of the Northern Yuan (1368–1370)
Biligtü Khan Ayushiridara, Emperor (1370–1378)
Uskhal Khan Tögüs Temür, Emperor (1378–1388)
Jorightu Khan Yesüder, Khan (1388–c.1392)
Engke, Khan (?–1392)
Elbeg Nigülesügchi, Khan (1392–1399)
Gün Temür, Khan (1400–1402)

Asia: Southeast

Brunei

Bruneian Empire (complete list) –
Muhammad Shah, Sultan (1368–1402)

Cambodia

Khmer Empire (complete list) –
Indravarman III, King (1295–1307)
Indrajayavarman, King (1307–1327)
Jayavarman IX, King (1327–1336)
Trosok Peam, King (1336–1340)
Nippean Bat, King (1340–1346)
Lompong Racha, King (1346–1351)
Soryavong, King (1357–1363)
Borom Reachea I, King (1363–1373)
Thomma Saok, King (1373–1393)
Intharacha, King (1394–c.1421)

Indonesia

Indonesia: Java

Sunda Kingdom (complete list) –
Rakeyan Saunggalah, Maharaja (1297–1303)
Prabu Citraganda, Maharaja (1303–1311)
Prabu Lingga Dewata, Maharaja (1311–1333)
Prabu Ajigunawisesa, Maharaja (1333–1340)
Prabu Maharaja Lingga Buana, Maharaja (1340–1357)
Mangkubumi Suradipati, Maharaja (1357–1371)
Prabu Raja Wastu, Maharaja (1371–1475)

Majapahit: Rajasa dynasty (complete list) –
Raden Wijaya, King (1294–1309)
Jayanagara, King (1309–1328)
Tribhuwana Wijayatunggadewi, King (1328–1350)
Hayam Wuruk, King (1350–1389),
Wikramawardhana, King (1389–1429)

Indonesia: Sumatra

Dharmasraya/ Pagaruyung Kingdom: Mauli dynasty (complete list) –
Akarendrawarman, King (c.1300)
Adityawarman, King (c.1347–1375)
Ananggawarman, King (c.1375)
Bijayendrawarman ruler (14th century)

Samudera Pasai Sultanate (complete list) –
Al-Malik azh-Zhahir I, Sultan (1297–1326)
Ahmad I, Sultan (1326–1330s)
Al-Malik azh-Zhahir II, Sultan (1330s–1349)
Zainal Abidin I, Sultan (1349–1406)

Indonesia: Kalimantan (Borneo)

Kutai Kartanegara Sultanate –
Aji Batara Agung Dewa Sakti, Sultan (c.1300–1325)

Negara Daha –
Raden Sekarsungsang, ruler (c.1400–15th century)

Indonesia: Sulawesi

Gowa-Tallo –
Tumanurung Baine, Queen (mid 14th century)
Tumassalangga Baraya, King (late 14th century)
I Puang Lowe Lembang, King (14th/15th century)

Bone state –
ManurungngE Rimatajang, King (1330-?)

Luwu –
Anakaji, Datu (1293–1330)
Tampa Balusu, Datu (1330–1365)
Tanra Balusu, Datu (1365–1402)

Indonesia: Lesser Sunda Islands

Bali Kingdom (complete list) –
Jaya dynasty
Mahaguru Dharmottungga Warmadewa, King (before 1324–1328)
Walajayakertaningrat, King (1328-?)
Śri Astasura Ratna Bumi Banten, King (fl.1332–1337)
Samprangan
Sri Aji Kresna Kepakisan, King (14th century)
Dalem Samprangan, King (14th/15th century)

Indonesia: Maluku Islands

Sultanate of Tidore (complete list) –
Sele, King (1334–1372)
Matagena, King (1372–1405)

Sultanate of Ternate (complete list) –
Bakuku/ Kalabata, King (1298–1304)
Ngara Malamo/ Komala, King (1304–1317)
Patsaranga Malamo/ Aitsi, King (1317–1322)
Cili Aiya/ Sidang Arif Malamo, King (1322–1331)
Panji Malamo/ A'ali, King (1331–1332)
Shah Alam, King (1332–1343)
Tulu Malamo/ Fulu, King (1343–1347)
Kie Mabiji/ Buhayati I, King (1347–1350)
Ngolo-ma-Kaya/ Muhammad Shah, King (1350–1357)
Mamoli/ Momole, King (1357–1359)
Gapi Malamo I/ Muhammad Bakar, King (1359–1372)
Gapi Baguna I, King (1372–1377)
Komala Pulu/ Bessi Muhammad Hassan, King (1377–1432)

Laos

Lan Xang (complete list) –
Fa Ngum, King (1353–1373)
Samsenethai, King (1373–1416)

Malaysia: Peninsular

Old Pahang Kingdom –
Tajau, Maharaja (c.1378)

Kedah Sultanate (complete list) –
Mahmud Shah I, Sultan (1280–1321)
Ibrahim Shah, Sultan (1321–1373)
Sulaiman Shah I, Sultan (1373–1423)

Kelantan Sultanate: Jambi dynasty (complete list) –
Sang Tawal, Raja (1267–1339)
Mahmud ibnu 'Abdu'llah, Sultan (1339–1362)
Baki Shah, Sultan (1362–1418)

Malacca Sultanate (complete list) –
Parameswara, Raja of Singapura (1389–1398), Sultan of Malacca (1400–1414)

Myanmar / Burma

Myinsaing Kingdom (complete list) –
Athinkhaya, Co-Regent (1297–1310)
Yazathingyan, Co-Regent (1297–1313)
Thihathu, Co-Regent of Myinsaing (1297–1313), King of Myinsaing–Pinya (1313–1325)

Pinya Kingdom (complete list) –
Thihathu, Co-Regent of Myinsaing (1297–1313), King of Myinsaing–Pinya (1313–1325)
Uzana I, King (1325–1340)
Sithu, Regent (1340–1344)
Kyawswa I, King (1344–1350)
Kyawswa II, King (1350–1359)
Narathu, King (1359–1364)
Uzana II, King (1364)
Thado Minbya, King of Pinya & Sagaing (1364–1365), King of Ava (1365–1367)

Sagaing Kingdom (complete list) –
Saw Yun, King (1315–1327)
Tarabya I, King (1327–1335/36)
Shwetaungtet, King (1335/36–1339)
Kyaswa, King (1339–1349)
Nawrahta Minye, King (1349)
Tarabya II, King (1349–1352)
Minbyauk Thihapate, King (1352–1364)
Thado Minbya, King of Pinya & Sagaing (1364–1365), King of Ava (1365–1367)

Kingdom of Ava (complete list) –
Thado Minbya, King of Pinya & Sagaing (1364–1365), King of Ava (1365–1367)
Swa Saw Ke, King (1367–1400)
Tarabya, King (1400)
Minkhaung I, King (1400–1421)

Hanthawaddy Kingdom (complete list) –
Wareru, King (1287–1307)
Hkun Law, King (1307–1311)
Saw O, King (1311–1323)
Saw Zein, King (1323–1330)
Zein Pun, King (1330)
Saw E, King (1330)
Binnya E Law, King (1330–1348)
Binnya U, King (1348–1384)
Maha Dewi, Regent (1383–1384)
Razadarit, King (1384–1421)

Philippines

Tondo (complete list) –
Gambang, Rajah (c.1390–1417)

Madja-as (complete list) –
Paiburong, Datu (13th/14th century)
Balengkaka, Datu (14th century)
Kalantiaw, Datu (1365–1437)

Rajahnate of Cebu –
Alho, Rajah (c.14th century)
Ukob, Rajah (c.14th century)

Singapore

Kingdom of Singapura –
Sang Nila Utama, Raja (1299–1347)
Sri Wikrama Wira, Raja (1347–1362)
Sri Rana Wikrama, Raja (1362–1375)
Sri Maharaja, Raja (1375–1389)
Parameswara, Raja of Singapura (1389–1398), Sultan of Malacca (1400–1414)

Thailand

Sukhothai Kingdom (complete list) –
Loe Thai, King (1298–1323)
Ngua Nam Thum, King (1323–1347)
Maha Thammaracha I, King (1347–1368)
Maha Thammaracha II, King (1368–1399)
Maha Thammaracha III, King (1400–1419)

Lan Na (complete list) –
Mangrai, King of Ngoenyang (1261–1292), King of Lan Na (1292–1311)
Chaiyasongkhram, King (1311–1325)
Saenphu, King (1325–1334)
Khamfu, King (1334–1336)
Phayu, King (1336–1355)
Kue Na, King (1355–1385)
Saenmueangma, King (1385–1401)

Ayutthaya Kingdom (complete list) –
Uthong dynasty
Uthong, King (1351–1369)
Ramesuan, King (1369–1370)
Ramrachathirat, King (1370–1388)
Suphannaphum dynasty
Borommarachathirat I, King (1370–1388)
Thong Lan, King (1388)
Uthong dynasty
Ramesuan, King (1388–1395)
Ramrachathirat, King (1395–1409)

Vietnam

Champa (complete list) –
Chế Mân, King (1288–1307)
Chế Chi, King (1307–1312)
Chế Nang, Vassal King (to the Trần dynasty, 1312–1318)
Chế Anan, King (1318–1342)
Tra Hoa Bo Dê, King (1342–1360)
Po Binasuor, King (1360–1390)
Ko Cheng, King (1390–1400)
Jaya Simhavarman V, King (1400–1441)

Đại Việt: Trần dynasty (complete list) –
Trần Anh Tông, Emperor (1293–1314)
Trần Minh Tông, Emperor (1314–1329)
Trần Hiến Tông, Emperor (1329–1341)
Trần Dụ Tông, Emperor (1341–1369)
Hôn Đức Công, Emperor (1369–1370)
Trần Nghệ Tông, Emperor (1370–1372)
Trần Duệ Tông, Emperor (1372–1377)
Trần Phế Đế, Emperor (1377–1388)
Trần Thuận Tông, Emperor (1388–1398)
Trần Thiếu Đế, Emperor (1398–1400)

Đại Việt: Hồ dynasty (complete list) –
Hồ Quý Ly, Emperor (1400–1401)

Asia: South

Bengal and Northwest India

Bengal Sultanate: Sonargaon (complete list) –
Fakhruddin Mubarak Shah, Sultan (1338–1349)
Ikhtiyaruddin Ghazi Shah, Sultan (1349–1352)
Shamsuddin Ilyas Shah, Sultan (1339–1342)
Alauddin Ali Shah, Sultan (1339–1342)
Shamsuddin Ilyas Shah, Sultan (1342–1352)

Bengal Sultanate: Ilyas Shahi dynasty (complete list) –
Shamsuddin Ilyas Shah, Sultan (1352–1358)
Sikandar Shah, Sultan (1358–1390)
Ghiyasuddin Azam Shah, Sultan (1390–1411)

Bengal Sultanate: Balban dynasty (complete list) –
Nasiruddin Bughra Khan, Governor (1281–1287), Sultan (1287–1291)
Rukunuddin Kaikaus, Sultan (1291–1300)
Shamsuddin Firoz Shah, Sultan (1300–1322)

Chutia Kingdom (complete list) –
Vikramadhwajpal, King (1278–1302)
Gauradhwajpal, King (1302–1322)
Sankhadhwajpal, King (1322–1343)
Mayuradhwajpal, King (1343–1361)
Jayadhwajpal, King (1361–1383)
Karmadhwajpal, King (1383–1401)

Mallabhum (complete list) –
Prithwi Malla, King (1295–1319)
Dinabandhu Malla, King (1334–1345)
Shiv Singh Malla, King (1370–1407)

India

Ahmadnagar Sultanate of the Deccan (complete list) –
Ahmad Nizam Shah I, Sultan (1490–1510)

Alirajpur (complete list) –
Anand Deo, Rana (1437–1440)
Pratap Deo, Rana (1440–?)
Chanchal Deo, Rana (?)

Bahmani Sultanate (complete list) –
Ala-ud-Din Bahman Mohamed bin Laden Shah, Sultan (1347–1358)
Muhammad Shah I, Sultan (1358–1375)
Ala ud din Mujahid Shah, Sultan (1375–1378)
Daud Shah I, Sultan (1378)
Muhammad Shah II, Sultan (1378–1397)
Ghiyas ud din Tahmatan Shah, Sultan (1397)
Shams ud din Daud Shah II, Sultan (1397)
Taj ud-Din Firuz Shah, Sultan (1397–1422)

Chera/Perumals of Makotai (complete list) –
Ravi Varma, King (1299–1313)
Vira Udaya Martanda Varma, King (1313–1333)
Aditya Varma Tiruvadi, King (1333–1335)
Vira Rama Udaya Martanda Varma Tiruvadi, King (1335–1342)
Vira Kerala Varma Tiruvadi, King (1342–1363)
Vira Martanda Varma III, King (1363–1366)
Vira Rama Martanda Varma, King (1366–1382)
Vira Ravi Varma, King (1383–1416)

Delhi sultanate: Tughlaq dynasty (complete list) –
Ghiyasu-Din Tughluq I, Sultan (1321–1325)
Muhammad Shah Tughuluq I, Sultan (1325–1351)
Firuz Shah Tughluq, Sultan (1351–1388)
Ghiyas-ud-Din Tughluq II, Sultan (1388–1389)
Abu Bakr Shah, Sultan (1389–1390)
Muhammad Shah Tughluq III, Sultan (1390–1394)
Ala ud-din Sikandar Shah Tughluq, Sultan (1394)
Muhammad Shah Tughuluq IV, Sultan (1394–1413)

Farooqui dynasty (complete list) –
Nasir Khan, Sultan (1399–1437)

Eastern Ganga dynasty (complete list) –
Narasimha Deva II, King (1279–1306)
Bhanu Deva II, King (1306–1328)
Narasimha Deva III, King (1328–1352)
Bhanu Deva III, King (1352–1378)
Narasimha Deva IV, King (1379–1424)

Gujarat Sultanate (complete list) –
Muzaffar Shah I, Sultan (1391–1403, 1404–1411)

Hoysala Empire (complete list) –
Veera Ballala III, King (1292–1343)

Jaunpur Sultanate (complete list) –
Malik Sarwar, Sultan (1394–1399)
Malik Qaranfal, Sultan (1399–1402)

Jawhar (complete list) –
Jaydeorao Mukne, Raja (?–1400)
Nemshah I, Raja (1400–1422)

Kakatiya dynasty (complete list) –
Prataparudra-deva, King (c.1289–1323)

Madurai Sultanate (complete list) –
Ahsan Khan, Sultan (1335–1339)
Udauji, Sultan (1339)
Feroze Khan, Sultan (1339–1340)
Muhammad Damghani, Sultan (1340–1344)
Mahmud Damghani, Sultan (1344–1345)
Adil Khan, Sultan (1356–1358)
Mubarak Khan, Sultan (1358–1368)
Sikandar Khan, Sultan (1368–1378)

Musunuri Nayakas (complete list) –
Musunuri Prolaya Nayudu, King (1323–1333)
Musunuri Kapaya Nayak, King (1333–1368)

Pandyan dynasty (complete list) –
Maravarman Kulasekara Pandyan I, King (1268–1308)
Sundara Pandyan IV, King (1309–1327)
Vira Pandyan IV, King (1309–1345)

Paramara dynasty of Malwa (complete list) –
Mahlakadeva, King (?–1305)

Rajpipla (complete list) –
Arjunsinhji, Maharana (c.1340–?)
Bhansinhji, Maharana (14th–15th century)

Reddi Kingdom (complete list) –
Prolaya Vema Reddi, King (1325–1353)
Anavota Reddi, King (1353–1364)
Anavema Reddi, King (1364–1386)
Kumaragiri Reddi, King (1386–1402)
Kataya Vema Reddi, King (1395–1414)

Seuna (Yadava) dynasty (complete list) –
Ramachandra, King (c.1271–1308)

Sisodia (complete list) –
Samar Singh, Rajput (1273–1301)
Ratan Singh, Rajput (1301–1303)
Hammir Singh, Rajput (1326–1364)
Kshetra Singh, Rajput (1364–1382)
Lakha Singh, Rajput (1382–1421)

Udaipur (complete list) –
Hammir Singh, Maharana (1326–1364)
Kheta, Maharana (1364–1382)
Lakha, Maharana (1382–1421)

Vijayanagara Empire: Sangama dynasty (complete list) –
Harihara I, King (1336–1356)
Bukka Raya I, King (1356–1377)
Harihara Raya II, King (1377–1404)

Maldives

Sultanate of the Maldives (complete list) –
Theemuge dynasty
Davud, Sultan (1302–1307)
Omar I, Sultan (1307–1341)
Ahmed Shihabuddine, Sultan (1341–1347)
Khadijah, Sultana (1347–1363)
Mohamed el-Jameel, Sultan (1363–1364)
Khadijah, Sultana (1364–1374)
Abdullah I, Sultan (1374–1376)
Khadijah, Sultana (1376–1380)
Raadhafathi, Sultana (1380)
Mohamed I, Sultan (1380–1385)
Dhaain, Sultana (1385–1388)
Abdullah II, Sultan (1388)
Osman I, Sultan (1388)
Hilaalee dynasty
Hassan I, Sultan (1388–1398)
Ibrahim I, Sultan (1398)
Hussain I, Sultan (1398–1409)

Nepal

Khasa kingdom
Ri'u sMal (Ripumalla), King (fl.1312–1314)
San gha sMal (Sangramamalla), King (early 14th century)
Ajitamalla, King (1321–1328)
Kalyanamalla, King (14th century)
Pratapamalla, King (14th century)
Pu ni sMal (Punyamalla), King (fl.1336–1339)
sPri ti sMal (Prthivimalla), King (fl.1354–1358)

Malla (complete list) –
Ananta Malla, Raja (c.1274–1310)
Jayananada Deva, Raja (c.1310–1320)
Jayari Malla, Raja (c.1320–1344)
Jayarudra Malla, Raja (c.1320–1326)
Jayaraja Deva, Raja (c.1347–1361)
Jayarjuna Malla, Raja (c.1361–1382)
Jayasthiti Malla, Raja (c.1382–1395)
Jayajyotir Malla, Raja (c.1395–1428)
Jayakiti Malla, Raja (c.1395–1403)
Jayadharma Malla, Raja (c.1395–1408)

Pakistan

Samma dynasty (complete list) –
Unar, Jam (1336–1339)
Junan, Jam (1339–1352)
Banhabina, Jam (1352–1367)
Tamachi, Jam (1367–1379)
Salahuddin, Jam (1379–1389)
Nizamuddin I, Jam (1389–1391)
Ali Sher, Jam (1391–1398)
Karn, Jam (1398)
Fath Khan, Jam (1398–1414)

Sri Lanka

Kingdom of Dambadeniya (complete list) –
Parakkamabahu III, King (1302–1310)
Bhuvanaikabahu II, King (1310–1325/6)
Parakkamabahu IV, King (1325/6–1325/6)
Bhuvanaikabahu III, King (1325/6–1325/6)
Vijayabahu V, King (1325/6–1344/5)

Kingdom of Gampola (complete list) –
Bhuvanaikabahu IV, King (1344/5–1353/4)
Parakkamabahu V, King (1344/5–1359)
Vikramabahu III, King (1357–1374)
Bhuvanaikabahu V, King (1372/3–1391/2)
Vira Bahu II, King (1391/2–1397)
unnamed son of Vira Bahu II, King (1397)
unnamed son of Vira Bahu II, King (1397)
Vira Alakesvara, King (1397–1409)

Jaffna Kingdom (complete list) –
Vickrama Cinkaiariyan, King (1292–1302)
Varodaya Cinkaiariyan, King (1302–1325)
Martanda Cinkaiariyan, King (1325–1347)
Gunabhooshana Cinkaiariyan, King (1347–1371)
Virodaya Cinkaiariyan, King (1371–1380)
Jeyaveera Cinkaiariyan, King (1380–1410)

Asia: West

Turkey

Ottoman Empire (complete list) –
Osman I, Sultan (c.1299–1326)
Orhan, Sultan (1323/4–1362)
Murad I, Sultan (1362–1389)
Bayezid I, Sultan (1389–1402)

Yemen

Kathiri State of Seiyun –
Badr as-Sahab ibn al-Habrali Bu Tuwairik, Sultan (1395–1430)

Yemeni Zaidi State (complete list) –
al-Mahdi Muhammad bin al-Mutahhar, Imam (1301–1328)
al-Mu'ayyad Yahya, Imam (1328–1346)
an-Nasir Ali bin Salah, Imam (1328–1329)
Ahmad bin Ali al-Fathi, Imam (1329–1349)
al-Wathiq al-Mutahhar, Imam (1349)
al-Mahdi Ali bin Muhammad, Imam (1349–1372)
al-Nasir Muhammad Salah al-Din, Imam (1372–1391)
al-Mansur Ali bin Salah ad-Din, Imam (1391–1436)
al-Hadi Ali, Imam (1393–1432)

Europe

Europe: Balkans

Achaea

Principality of Achaea (complete list) –
Isabella, Princess (1289–1307)
Philip I, Prince (1301–1307)
Philip II, Prince (1307–1313)
Matilda, Princess (1313–1322) and Louis I, Prince (1313–1316)
John, Prince (1322–1332)
Robert, Prince (1332–1364)
Philip III, Prince (1364–1373)
Joan I, Princess (1373–1381)
James, Prince (1380–1383)
Charles III, Prince (1383–1386)
Pedro de San Superano, Prince (1396–1402)

Archipelago

Duchy of the Archipelago (complete list) –
Marco II, Duke (1262–1303)
Guglielmo I, Duke (1303–1323)
Niccolò I, Duke (1323–1341)
Giovanni I, Duke (1341–1362)
Florence Sanudo, Duchess (1362–1371)
Nicholas II, Duke (1364–1371)
Nicholas III dalle Carceri, Duke (1371–1383)
Francesco I, Duke (1383–1397)
Giacomo I, Duke (1397–1418)

Bulgaria

Second Bulgarian Empire (complete list) –
Theodore Svetoslav, Emperor (1300–1322)
George Terter II, Emperor (1322–1323)
Michael Shishman, Emperor (1323–1330)
Ivan Stephen, Emperor (1330–1331)
Ivan Alexander, Emperor (1331–1371)
Ivan Sratsimir, co-Emperor (1356–1396)
Ivan Shishman, co-Emperor (1371–1395)

Byzantium

Byzantine Empire (complete list) –
Michael IX Palaiologos, co-Emperor (1294–1320)
Andronikos III Palaiologos, Emperor (1321–1341)
John V Palaiologos, Emperor (1341–1376, 1379–1390, 1390–1391)
John VI Kantakouzenos, co-Emperor (1347–1353)
Matthew Kantakouzenos, co-Emperor (1353–1357)
Andronikos IV Palaiologos, Emperor (1376–1379)
John VII Palaiologos, Emperor (1390)
Manuel II Palaiologos, Emperor (1391–1425)

Croatia

Republic of Ragusa (complete list) –
Nicola Sorgo, Rector (1358–?)
Marco Bobali three time Rector, Rector (1370–1390)

Morea

Despotate of the Morea (complete list) –
Manuel Kantakouzenos, Despot (1349–1380)
Matthew Kantakouzenos, Despot (1380–1383)
Demetrios I Kantakouzenos, Despot (1383)
Theodore I Palaiologos, Despot (1383–1407)

Serbia

Kingdom of Serbia / Serbian Empire (complete list) –
Stefan Milutin, King (1282–1321)
Stefan Konstantin, King (1321–1322)
Stefan Dečanski, King (1322–1331)
Stefan Dušan, King (1331–1346), Emperor (1346–1355)
Stefan Uroš V King (1346–1355), Emperor (1355–1371)
Vukašin King (1365–1371)

Kingdom of Syrmia (complete list) –
Stefan Dragutin, King of Serbia (1276–1282), King of Syrmia (1282–1316)
Vladislav, King (1316–1325)

Moravian Serbia (complete list) –
Lazar, Prince (1374–1379)
Stefan Lazarević, Prince (1389–1402), Despot (1402–1427)

Rhodes

Hospitaller Rhodes: Knights Hospitaller (complete list) –
Foulques de Villaret, Grand Master (1305–1319)
Maurice de Pagnac, unrecognized Grand Master (1317–1319)
Hélion de Villeneuve, Grand Master (1319–1346)
Dieudonné de Gozon, Grand Master (1346–1353)
Pierre de Corneillan, Grand Master (1353–1355)
Roger de Pins, Grand Master (1355–1365)
Raymond Berengar, Grand Master (1365–1374)
Robert de Juilly, Grand Master (1374–1376)
Juan Fernández de Heredia, Grand Master (1376–1396)
Riccardo Caracciolo, Grand Master (1383–1395)
Philibert de Naillac, Grand Master (1396–1421)

Europe: British Isles

Scotland

Kingdom of Scotland (complete list) –
Robert I, King (1306–1329)
David II, King (1329–1371)
Robert II, King (1371–1390)
Robert III, King (1390–1406)

England and Ireland

Kingdom of England and Lordship of Ireland (complete list) –
Edward I, King and Lord (1272–1307)
Edward II, King and Lord (1307–1327)
Edward III, King and Lord (1327–1377)
Richard II, King and Lord (1377–1399)
Henry IV, King and Lord (1399–1413)

Ireland

Airgíalla (complete list) –
Brian mac Eochada, King (1283–1311)
Ralph/Roolb mac Eochada, King (1311–1314)
Mael Sechlainn mac Eochada, King (1314–?)
Murchad Mór mac Briain, King (?–1331)
Seoan mac Maoilsheachlainn, King (1331–1342)
Aodh mac Roolb, King (1342–1344)
Murchadh Óg mac Murchada, King (1344–1344)
Maghnus mac Eochadha, King (1344–1357)
Pilib mac Rooilbh, King (1357–1362)
Brian Mór mac Aodh, King (1362–1365)
Niall mac Murchadha, King (1365–1368)
Brian Mór mac Aodh, King (1368–1371)
Pilib Ruadh mac Briain, King (1371–1403)

East Breifne (complete list) –
Gilla-Isa Ruaid O'Raigillig, ruler (1327/30)
Matha son of Gilla-Isa O'Raigillig, ruler (1304)
Mael Sechlainn O'Raigillig, ruler (1328)
Richard [Risderd] O'Reilly, ruler (1349–1346/49)
Cu Chonnacht O'Reilly, ruler (1362/65)
Philip O'Reilly, ruler (1365–1366/69)
Magnus O'Reilly, ruler (1366/69–1366/69)
Philip O'Reilly, ruler (1366/69–1384)
Thomas, King (1384–1390)
John, ruler (1390–1400)
Gilla-Isa, ruler (1400)

West Breifne (complete list) –
Amlaib Ó Ruairc, King (c.1275–1307)
Domnall Carrach Ó Ruairc, King (1307–1311)
Ualgarg Mór Ó Ruairc, King (1316–1346)
Flaithbheartach Ó Ruairc, King (1346–1349)
Aodh Bán Ó Ruairc, King (1349–1352)
Flaithbheartach Ó Ruairc, King (1352–1352)
Tadgh na gcoar O'Rourke, King (1352–1376)
Gilla Crist Ó Ruairc, Lord (?–1378)
Tigernán mór Ó Ruairc, King (1376–1418)

Connachta (complete list) –
Aedh Ó Conchobair, King (1293–1309)

Leinster (complete list) –
Muiris mac Muirchertach mac Murchada Caomhánach, King (1282–1314)
Art mac Murchada Caomhánach, King (1314–1323)
Domhnall mac Art mac Murchada Caomhánach, King (1323–1338)
Domhnall mac Domhnall mac Murchada Caomhánach, King (1338–1347)
Muirchertach mac Muiris mac Murchada Caomhánach, King (1347–1354)
Art Mór mac Murchada Caomhánach, King (1354–1362)
Diarmait mac Murchada Caomhánach, King (1362–1369)
Donnchadh mac Muirchertach mac Murchada Caomhánach, King (1369–1375)
Art Mór mac Murchadha Caomhánach, King (1369–1375)
Art Óg mac Murchadha Caomhánach, King (1375–1417)

Magh Luirg (complete list) –
Maelruanaidh mac Diarmata, King (1294–1331)
Tomaltach gCear mac Diarmata, King (1331–1336)
Conchobhair mac Diarmata, King (1336–1343)
Ferghal mac Diarmata, King (1343–1368)
Aedh mac Diarmata, King (1368–1393)
Maelruanaidh mac Diarmata, King (1393–1398)
Conchobair Óg mac Diarmata, King (1398–1404)

Síol Anmchadha (complete list) –
Murchadh Ó Madadhan, Lord (1286–1327)
Eoghan Ó Madadhan, Lord (1327–1347)
Murchadh Ó Madadhain, Lord (1347–1371)
Eoghan Mór Ó Madadhan, Lord (1371–1410)

Europe: Central

See also List of state leaders in the 14th-century Holy Roman Empire

Holy Roman Empire, Kingdom of Germany (complete list, complete list) –
Albert I, King (1298–1308)
Henry VII, Holy Roman Emperor (1312–1313), King (1308–1313)
Frederick the Fair, King (1314–1330)
Louis IV, Holy Roman Emperor (1328–1347), King (1314–1347)
Charles IV, Holy Roman Emperor (1355–1378), King (1346–1378)
Wenceslaus, King (1376–1400)
Rupert, King (1400–1410)

Hungary

Kingdom of Hungary (1301–1526) (complete list) –
Andrew III, King (1290–1301)
Wenceslaus, King (1301–1305)
Otto, King (1305–1307)
Charles I, King (1308–1342)
Louis I, King (1342–1382)
Mary I, Queen (1382–1385, 1386–1395)
Charles II, King (1385–1386)
Sigismund, King (1387–1437)

Poland

Kingdom of Poland (complete list) –
Przemysł II, High Duke (1290–1291), King (1295–1296)
Wenceslaus II, High Duke (1291–1300), King (1300–1305)
Wenceslaus III, King (1305–1306)
Władysław I the Elbow-high, King (1320–1333)
Casimir III the Great, King (1333–1370)
Louis I the Hungarian, King (1370–1382)
Jadwiga, Queen (1384–1399)
Władysław II Jagiełło, King (1386–1434)

Duchy of Opole (complete list) –
Bolko I, Duke (1281–1313)
Albert, co-Duke (1313–1323)
Bolko II, Duke (1313–1356)
Henry, co-Duke (1356–1365)
Bolko III co-Duke (1356–1370)
Władysław II, Duke (1356–1401)
Bernard, co-Duke (1396–1400)
Bolko IV, Duke (1396–1437)

Duchy of Masovia (complete list) –
Bolesław II, Duke of Płock (1275–1294), Duke of Masovia (1294–1313)
Siemowit III, co-Duke of Warsaw (1341–1349), of Rawa (1345–1349), Duke of Warsaw (1349–1355), of Masovia (1355–1381)

Duchy of Masovia: Warsaw (complete list) –
Trojden I, Duke of Czersk (1310–1313), Duke of Warsaw (1313–1341)
Casimir I, co-Duke of Warsaw (1341–1349), co-Duke of Rawa (1345–1349), Duke of Rawa (1349–1355)
Siemowit III, co-Duke of Warsaw (1341–1349), of Rawa (1345–1349), Duke of Warsaw (1349–1355), of Masovia (1355–1381)
Janusz I the Elder, Duke (1381–1429)

Duchy of Masovia: Płock (complete list) –
Wenceslaus I, Duke (1313–1336)
Siemowit II, Regent (1336–1340)
Trojden I, Regent (1336–1340)
Bolesław III, Duke (1336–1351)
Siemowit IV the Younger, Duke of Płock and Rawa (1381–1426)

Duchy of Masovia: Rawa (complete list) –
Siemowit II, Duke of Rawa (1313–1345)
Casimir I, co-Duke of Warsaw (1341–1349), co-Duke of Rawa (1345–1349), Duke of Rawa (1349–1355)
Siemowit III, co-Duke of Warsaw (1341–1349), co-Duke of Rawa (1345–1349), Duke of Warsaw (1349–1355), Duke of Masovia (1355–1381)
Siemowit IV the Younger, Duke of Płock and Rawa (1381–1426)

State of the Teutonic Order (complete list) –
Gottfried von Hohenlohe, Grand Master (1297–1303)
Siegfried von Feuchtwangen, Grand Master (1303–1311)
Karl von Trier, Grand Master (1311–1324)
Werner von Orseln, Grand Master (1324–1330)
Luther von Braunschweig (Lothar), Grand Master (1331–1335)
Dietrich von Altenburg, Grand Master (1335–1341)
Ludolf König von Wattzau, Grand Master (1342–1345)
Heinrich Dusemer, Grand Master (1345–1351)
Winrich von Kniprode, Grand Master (1351–1382)
Konrad Zöllner von Rotenstein, Grand Master (1382–1390)
Konrad von Wallenrode, Grand Master (1391–1393)
Konrad von Jungingen, Grand Master (1393–1407)

Europe: East

Blue Horde (complete list) –
Köchü, Khan (1280–1302)
Buyan, Khan (1302–1309)
Sasibuqa, Khan (1309/1310–1315)
Ilbasan, Khan (1310/15–1320)
Mubarak Khwaja, Khan (1320–1344)
Chimtay, Khan (1344–1360)
Urus, Khan (1372–1374)
Toqtaqiya, Khan (1377)
Timur-Malik, Khan (1377–1378)

Moldavia (complete list) –
Dragoș, Voivode (c.1347–c.1354)
Sas, Voivode (c.1354–c.1363)
Balc of Moldavia, Voivode (1359/64)
Bogdan I the Founder, Voivode (c.1359–1367)
Petru I, Voivode (1367–1368)
Lațcu, Voivode (1368–1375)
Petru II Mușat, Voivode (1375–1391)
Roman I, Voivode (1391–1394)
Ștefan I, Voivode (1394–1399)
Iuga, Voivode (1399–1400)
Alexandru I the Good, Voivode (1400–1432)

Grand Duchy of Moscow (complete list) –
Daniel of Moscow, Grand prince (1283–1303)
Yury, Grand prince (1303–1325)
Ivan I, Grand prince (1332–1340)
Simeon the Proud, Grand prince (1340–1353)
Ivan II, Grand prince (1353–1359)
Dmitry Donskoy, Grand prince (1359–1389)
Vasily I, Grand prince (1389–1425)

Vladimir-Suzdal (complete list) –
Andrey III, Grand Duke (1281–1283, 1293–1304)
Michael of Tver, Grand Duke (1304–1318)
Yuri (III) of Moscow, Grand Duke (1318–1322)
Dmitry I, Grand Duke (1322–1326)
Alexander of Tver, Grand Duke (1326–1327)
Alexander III, Grand Duke (1328–1331)
Ivan I of Moscow, Grand Duke (1332–1340)

Principality of Wallachia (complete list) –
Radu Negru, Prince (c.1290–1310)
Basarab I the Founder, Prince (c.1310–1352)
Nicolae Alexandru, Prince (1352–1364)
Vladislav I, Prince (c.1364–1377)
Radu I, Prince (c.1377–1383)
Dan I, Prince (c.1383–1386)
Mircea I the Elder, Prince (1386–1394, 1397–1418)
Vlad I the Usurper, Prince (1394–1397)

Europe: Nordic

Denmark

Denmark (complete list) –
Eric VI, King (1286–1319)
Christopher II, King (?) / Eric Christoffersen, King (?)
Valdemar III, King (?)
Valdemar IV, King (?)
Personal union of Denmark and Norway
Olaf II of Denmark, Olaf IV of Norway, King (1380–1387)

Duchy of Schleswig (complete list) –
Valdemar IV, Duke of Schleswig, Duke (1283–1312)
Eric II, Duke of Schleswig, Duke (1312–1325)
Valdemar III of Denmark, Duke (1325–1326, 1330–1364)
Gerhard III, Count of Holstein-Rendsburg, Duke (1326–1330)
Henry, Duke of Schleswig, Duke (1364–1375)
Henry II, Count of Holstein-Rendsburg, Duke (1375–1381/1384)
Nicholas, Count of Holstein-Rendsburg, Duke (1375–1386)
Gerhard VI, Count of Holstein-Rendsburg, Duke (1386–1404)

Norway

Kingdom of Norway (872–1397) (complete list) –
Haakon V, King (1299–1319)
Magnus IV of Sweden, Magnus VII of Norway, King (1319–1343)
Haakon VI, King (1343–1380)
Personal union of Denmark and Norway
Olaf II of Denmark, Olaf IV of Norway, King (1380–1387)

Sweden

Sweden (800–1521) (complete list) –
Birger, King (1290–1318)
Ingeborg of Norway, Regent (1318–1319)
Magnus IV, King (1318–1364)
Eric XII, King (1356–1359)
Haakon, King (1362–1364)
Albert, King (1364–1389)

Kalmar Union

Kalmar Union of Denmark, Sweden, and Norway (complete list, complete list, complete list) –
Margaret I, Queen Regent of Denmark (1387–1412), of Norway (1388–1412), of Sweden (1389–1412)
Eric of Pomerania, King (1389–1442)

Europe: Southcentral

See also List of state leaders in the 14th-century Holy Roman Empire#Italy

Kingdom of Italy (Holy Roman Empire) (complete list) –
Henry VII, King (1311–1313)
Louis IV, King (1327–1347)
Charles IV, King (1355–1378)

Margraviate of Modena, Reggio, and Ferrara (complete list) –
Azzo VIII, Marquis of Reggio (1293–1306), of Ferrara (1293–1308)
Aldobrandino II, Marquis of Modena (1293–1308), of Ferrara (1308–1326)
Fresco, Marquis of Ferrara (1308)
Rinaldo, Marquis of Ferrara (1317–1335)
Niccolò I, Marquis of Ferrara (1317–1344), of Modena (1336–1344)
Obizzo III, Marquis of Ferrara (1317–1352), of Modena (1336–1352)
Azzo IX, Marquis of Ferrara (1317–1318)
Bertoldo I, Marquis of Ferrara (1317–1343) 
Aldobrandino III, Marquis of Ferrara (1352–1361)
Niccolò II the Lame, Marquis of Modena (1352–1388), of Ferrara (1361–1388) 
Alberto V, Marquis of Ferrara (1361–1393), of Modena (1388–1393)
Niccolò III, Marquis of Ferrara and Modena (1393–1441), of Reggio (1405–1441)

March of Montferrat (complete list) –
John I, Marquis (1292–1305)
Theodore I, Marquis (1306–1338)
John II, Marquis (1338–1372)
Secondotto (Otto III), Marquis (1372–1378)
John III, Marquis (1378–1381)
Theodore II, Marquis (1381–1418)

Papal States (complete list) –
Boniface VIII, Pope (1294–1303)
Benedict XI, Pope (1303–1304)
Clement V, Pope (1305–1314)
John XXII, Pope (1316–1334)
Benedict XII, Pope (1334–1342)
Clement VI, Pope (1342–1352)
Innocent VI, Pope (1352–1362)
Urban V, Pope (1362–1370)
Gregory XI, Pope (1370–1378)
Urban VI, Pope (1378–1389)
Boniface IX, Pope (1389–1404)
From 1309 to 1376 the Papacy was based at Avignon, not Rome.

San Marino
Captains Regent (1243–1500) –
Giovanni di Causetta Giannini, Captain Regent (1302)
Arimino Baracone, Simone da Sterpeto, Captains Regent (1303)
Venturuccio di Giannuccio, Captain Regent (1321)
Giovanni di Causetta Giannini, Ugolino Fornaro, Captains Regent (1323)
Ser Bonanni Notaio, Mule Acatolli di Piandavello, Captains Regent (1325)
Ugucciolo da Valdragone, Captain Regent (1331)
Venturuzzo di Franceschino, Muzolo da Bauti, Captains Regent (1336)
Bentivegna da Valle, Foschino di Novello, Captains Regent (1337–1338)
Denaro Madroni, Fosco Raffanelli, Captains Regent (1338–1339)
Ricevuto, Gioagnolo di Acaptolo, Captains Regent (1339)
Bentivegna, Zanutino, Captains Regent (1341)
Ricevuto di Ughetto, Foschino di Filipuccio, Captains Regent (1342–1343)
Franzolino di Chillo, Cecco di Chillo, Captains Regent (1343)
Foschino Calcigni, Captain Regent (1347)
Francesco Pistorj, Ciapetta di Novello, Captains Regent (1351)
Giovanni di Guiduccio, Nino di Simonino, Captains Regent (1353)
Gioagnolo di Acaptolo, Paolo di Ceccolo, Captains Regent (1356)
Giovanni di Guiduccio, Foschino Calcigni, Captains Regent (1357)
Giovanni di Bianco, Captain Regent (1357)
Giovanni di Guiduccio, Corbello di Vita, Captains Regent (1359–1360)
Ciapetta di Novello, Nino di Simonino, Captains Regent (1360)
Foschino Calcigni, Giovanni di Bianco, Captains Regent (1360)
Guidino di Giovanni, Giovanni di Guiduccio, Captains Regent (1362–1363)
Giovanni di Bianco, Nino di Simonino, Captains Regent (1363)
Guidino di Giovanni, Cecco di Chillo, Captains Regent (1364)
Foschino Calcigni, Corbello Giannini, Captains Regent (1364)
Gioagnolo di Acaptolo, Ugolino di Giovanni Vanioli, Captains Regent (1365–1366)
Nicolino di Ariminuccio, Vanne di Nomaiolo, Captains Regent (1366)
Bartolino di Giovanni di Bianco, Nino di Simonino, Captains Regent (1366–1367)
Guidino di Giovanni, Paolo di Ceccolo, Captains Regent (1367)
Gioagnolo di Ugolinuccio, Ghino Fabbro, Captains Regent (1367–1368)
Muciolino di Ciolo, Giovanni di Riguccio, Captains Regent (1368)
Orbello di Vita Giannini, Ugolino di Giovanni Vanioli, Captains Regent (1368–1369)
Mignone Bauto, Lunardino di Bernardo Fabbro, Captains Regent (1369)
Gioagnolo di Ugolinuccio, Giovanni di Riguccio, Captains Regent (1369–1370)
Ciappetta di Novello, Ugolino di Giovanni, Captains Regent (1370)
Guidino di Giovanni, Paolo di Ceccolo, Captains Regent (1370–1371)
Nino di Simonino, Maxio di Tonso Alberghetti, Captains Regent (1371)
Mucciolino di Ciolo, Bartolino di Giovanni di Bianco, Captains Regent (1371–1372)
Corbello di Vita Giannini, Mignone Bauto, Captains Regent (1372)
Giovanni di Riguccio, Martino di Guerolo Pistorj, Captains Regent (1372–1373)
Ugolino di Giovanni, Lunardino di Bernardo, Captains Regent (1373)
Paolo di Ceccolo, Antonio di Mula, Captains Regent (1373–1374)
Andrea di Nanne, Guidino di Giovanni, Captains Regent (1374)
Giovanni di Riguccio, Gozio di Mucciolino, Captains Regent (1374–1375)
Ugolino di Giovanni, Paolino di Giovanni di Bianco, Captains Regent (1375)
Lunardino di Bernardo, Simone di Belluzzo, Captains Regent (1378)
Gozio di Mucciolino, Ondedeo di Tonso, Captains Regent (1378–1379)
Paolo di Ceccolo, Bartolino di Antonio, Captains Regent (1380–1381)
Lunardino di Bernardo, Samperino di Giovanni, Captains Regent (1381)
Maxio di Tonso, Niccolò di Giove, Captains Regent (1381–1382)
Ugolino di Giovanni, Giovanni di Andrea, Captains Regent (1382)
Giangio di Ceccolo, Bernardo di Guerolo, Captains Regent (1382–1383)
Paolino di Giovanni di Bianco, Guidino di Foschino, Captains Regent (1383)
Lunardino di Bernardo, Giannino di Cavalluccio, Captains Regent (1383–1384)
Samperino di Giovanni, Martino di Guerolo de' Pistorj, Captains Regent (1384)
Paolo di Ceccolo, Benetino di Fosco, Captains Regent (1384–1385)
Giovanni di Francesco, Gozio di Mucciolino, Captains Regent (1386)
Gozio di Mucciolino, Bartolino di Antonio, Captains Regent (1390–1391)
Giovanni di Francesco, Menguccio di Simonino, Captains Regent (1391)
Maxio di Tonso, Lunardino di Bernardo, Captains Regent (1391–1392)
Paolo di Ceccolo, Simone di Belluzzo, Captains Regent (1392)
Samperino di Giovanni, Giannino di Cavalluccio, Captains Regent (1392–1393)
Gozio di Mucciolino, Antonio Tegna, Captains Regent (1393)
Bartolino di Antonio, Nicolò di Giove, Captains Regent (1393–1394)
Lunardino di Bernardo, Martino di Guerolo de' Pistorj, Captains Regent (1394)
Ugolino di Giovanni, Cecco di Alessandro, Captains Regent (1394–1395)
Vita di Corbello, Giovanni di Andrea, Captains Regent (1395)
Simone di Belluzzo, Rigone di Giovanni, Captains Regent (1395–1396)
Samperino di Giovanni, Giovanni di Francesco, Captains Regent (1396)
Paolino di Giovanni di Bianco, Giovanni di Pasino, Captains Regent (1396–1397)
Bartolino di Antonio, Giacomino di Paolo, Captains Regent (1397)
Nicolò di Giove, Marino di Ghino Fabbro, Captains Regent (1397–1398)
Marino di Fosco, Giovanni di Andrea, Captains Regent (1398)
Gozio di Mucciolino, Rigone di Giovanni, Captains Regent (1398–1399)
Giovanni di Guidino, Simone di Belluzzo, Captains Regent (1399)
Martino di Guerolo de' Pistorj, Antonio di Tegna, Captains Regent (1399–1400)
Paolino di Giovanni di Bianco, Francesco di Corbello, Captains Regent (1400)
Ugolino di Giovanni, Betto di Guerolo, Captains Regent (1400–1401)

Republic of Venice (complete list) –
Pietro Gradenigo, Doge (1289–1311)
Marino Zorzi, Doge (1311–1312)
Giovanni Soranzo, Doge (1312–1328)
Francesco Dandolo, Doge (1328–1339)
Bartolomeo Gradenigo, Doge (1339–1342)
Andrea Dandolo, Doge (1342–1354)
Marino Faliero, Doge (1354–1355)
Giovanni Gradenigo, Doge (1355–1356)
Giovanni Dolfin, Doge (1356–1361)
Lorenzo Celsi, Doge (1361–1365)
Marco Cornaro, Doge (1365–1367)
Andrea Contarini, Doge (1367–1382)
Michele Morosini, Doge (1382–1382)
Antonio Venier, Doge (1382–1400)
Michele Steno, Doge (1400–1413)

Southern Italy

Kingdom of Naples (complete list) –
Charles II the Lame, King (1285–1309)
Robert I the Wise, King (1309–1343)
Joanna I, Queen (1343–1382)
Louis I, King (1348–1362)
Charles III the Short, King (1382–1386)
Ladislaus I the Magnanimous, King (1386–1390)
Louis I of Anjou, King (1382–1384)
Louis II, King (1389–1399)

Kingdom of Trinacria: Sicily (complete list) –
Frederick II, King (1295–1337)
Peter II, King (1337–1342)
Louis, King (1342–1355)
Frederick III, King (1355–1377)
Maria, Queen (1377–1401)

Principality of Taranto (complete list) –
Philip I, Prince (1294–1331)
Robert, Prince (1331–1346)
Louis, Prince (1346–1364)
Philip II, Prince (1364–1374)
Philip III, Prince (1356–?)
James of Baux, Prince (1374–1383)
Otto, Prince (1383–1393)
Raimondo del Balzo Orsini, Prince (1393–1406)

Europe: Southwest

Iberian Peninsula: Christian

Crown of Aragon (complete list) –
James II, King (1291–1327)
Alfonso IV, King (1327–1336)
Peter IV, King (1336–1387)
John I, King (1387–1396)
Martin, King (1396–1410)

Crown of Castile (complete list) –
Ferdinand IV the Summoned, King (1295–1312)
Alfonso XI the Just, King (1312–1350)
Peter the Cruel, King (1350–1369)
Henry II the Bastard, King (1369–1379)
John I, King (1379–1390)
Henry III the Infirm, King (1390–1406)

County of Barcelona (complete list) –
James II, Count (1291–1327)
Alphonse III, Count (1327–1336)
Peter III, Count (1336–1387)
John I, Count (1387–1396)
Martin the Humanist, Count (1396–1410)

Kingdom of Navarre (complete list) –
Joan I, Queen (1274–1305)
Philip I, King (1284–1305)
Louis I, King (1305–1316)
John I, King (1316)
Philip II, King (1316–1322)
Charles I, King (1322–1328)
Joan II, Queen (1328–1349)
Philip III, King (1328–1343)
Charles II, King (1349–1387)
Charles III, King (1387–1425)

Kingdom of Portugal (complete list) –
Denis I, King (1279–1325)
Afonso IV, King (1325–1357)
Peter I, King (1357–1367)
Ferdinand I, King (1367–1383)
John I, King (1385–1433)

County of Ribagorza (complete list) –
Peter, Count (1322–1381)
Alfonso I, Count (1365–1412)

Marca Hispanica

Andorra
Episcopal Co-Princes (complete list) –
Guillem de Montcada, Episcopal Co-Prince (1295–1308)
Ramon Trebaylla, Episcopal Co-Prince (1308–1326)
Arnau de Llordat, Episcopal Co-Prince (1326–1341)
Pere de Narbona, Episcopal Co-Prince (1341–1348)
Niccoló Capocci, Episcopal Co-Prince (1348–1351)
Hug Desbac, Episcopal Co-Prince (1351–1361)
Guillem Arnau i Palau, Episcopal Co-Prince (1361–1364)
Pedro Martínez Luna, Episcopal Co-Prince (1364–1370)
Berenguer d'Erill i de Pallars, Episcopal Co-Prince (1370–1387)
Galcerand de Vilanova, Episcopal Co-Prince (1387–1415)
French Co-Princes (complete list) –
Roger-Bernard III, French Co-Prince (1278–1302)
Gaston I, French Co-Prince (1302–1315)
Gaston II, French Co-Prince (1315–1343)
Gaston III Phoebus, French Co-Prince (1343–1391)
Matthew, French Co-Prince (1391–1398)
Isabella, French Co-Princess (1398–1413)

County of Osona (complete list) –
Bernard III of Cabrera, Count (1356–1364)

County of Cerdanya (complete list) –
James II, Count (1276–1311)
Sancho II, Count (1311–1324)
James III, Count (1324–1349)
James IV, Count (1349–1375)
Isabella, Count (1375–1403)

County of Urgell (complete list) –
Ermengol X, Count (1268–1314)
Alfonso IV of Aragon, Count (1314–1327)
James I of Urgell, Count (1327–1347)
Peter II of Urgell, Count (1347–1408)

Europe: West

France

Kingdom of France (complete list) –
Philip IV, King (1285–1314)
Louis X the Quarreller, King (1314–1316)
John I the Posthumous, King (1316–1316)
Philip V the Tall, King (1316–1322)
Charles IV the Fair, King (1322–1328)
Philip VI, King (1328–1350)
John II the Good, King (1350–1364)
Charles V the Wise, King (1364–1380)
Charles VI, King (1380–1422)

Anjou (complete list) –
Philip, Count (1293–1328)
John, Count (1332–1350)
Louis I, Duke (1339–1383)
Louis II, Duke (1377–1417)

Duchy of Aquitaine (complete list) –
Edward I Longshanks, Duke (1272–1307)
Edward II, Duke (1307–1325)
Edward III, Duke (1325–1362)

County of Artois (complete list) –
Robert II, Count (1250–1302)
Matilda, Countess (1302–1329)
Robert III, contested Count (1302–1329)
Joan I, Countess (1329–1330)
Joan II, Countess, and Odo, Count (1330–1347)
Philip I, Duke of Burgundy, Count (1347–1361)
Margaret I, Countess (1361–1382)
Louis III, Count (1382–1383)
Margaret II, Countess (1383–1405)

Auvergne (complete list) –
Robert VI, count of Auvergne, Count (1279–1317)
Robert VII, count of Auvergne, Count (1317–1325)
William XII of Auvergne, Count (1325–1332)
Joan I, Countess of Auvergne, Countess (1332–1360)
Philip of Burgundy, Count (1338–1346)
John II of France, Count (1350–1360)
Philip I, Count (1360–1361)
John I, count of Auvergne, Count (1361–1386)
John II, count of Auvergne, Count (1386–1394)
Joan II, Countess of Auvergne, Countess (1394–1422)
John, Duke of Berry, Count (1394–1416)

Avignon Papacy –
Clement V, Pope (1305–1314)
John XXII, Pope (1316–1334)
Benedict XII, Pope (1334–1342)
Clement VI, Pope (1342–1352)
Innocent VI, Pope (1352–1362)
Urban V, Pope (1362–1370)
Gregory XI, Pope (1370–1378)
Clement VII, Antipope (1378–1394)
Benedict XIII, Antipope (1394–1423; expelled from Avignon in 1403)

County of Boulogne (complete list) –
Robert II, Count (1277–1314)
Robert III, Count (1314–1325)
William II, Count (1325–1332)
Joanna I, Countess (1332–1360)
Philip II, Count (1338–1346)
Philip III, Count (1360–1361)
John II, Count (1361–1386)
John III, Count (1386–1404)

Bourbonnais (complete list) –
, Lady (1287–1310)

Duchy of Brittany (complete list) –
John II, Duke (1286–1305)
Arthur II, Duke (1305–1312)
John III, Duke (1312–1341)
Joan, Duchess (1341–1364)
Charles I, Duke (1341–1364)
John of Montfort, co-Duke (1341–1345)
John IV, disputed Duke (1345–1365), Duke (1345–1399)
John V, Duke (1399–1442)

Duchy of Burgundy (complete list) –
Robert II, Duke (1271–1306)
Hugh V, Duke (1306–1315)
Odo IV, Duke (1315–1350)
Philip I, Duke (1350–1361)
Philip II the Bold, Duke (1363–1404)

County of Maine (complete list) –
Charles II, Count (1285–1325)
Louis I, Count (1339–1384)
Louis II, Count (1384–1417)

Monaco (complete list) –
Rainier I, Lord (1297–1301)
Charles I, Lord (1331–1357)
Rainier II, Lord (1352–1357)
Louis, Lord (1395–1395, 1397–1402)
Jean I, Lord (1395–1395, 1419–1454)

County of Nevers (complete list) –
Louis I, Count (1280–1322)
Louis II, Count (1322–1346)
Louis III, Count (1346–1384)
Margaret, Countess (1384)
Philip I, Count (1384)
John I, Count (1384–1404)

County of Poitou (complete list) –
Philip I, Count (1293–1322)
John I, Count (1319–1364)
John II, Count (1340–1416)

Low Countries

County of Artois (complete list) –
Margaret II, Countess (1383–1405)

County of Flanders (complete list) –
Guy I, Count (1251–1305)
Robert III, Count (1305–1322)
Louis I, Count (1322–1346)
Louis II, Count (1346–1384)
Margaret III, Countess, and Philip II, Count (1384–1405)

Eurasia: Caucasus

Gazikumukh Khanate (complete list) –
Badr I, Shamkhal (1295–1304)
Akhsuvar I, Shamkhal (14th century)

Kingdom of Georgia (complete list) –
George V, King (1299–1302, 1314–1346) 
David IX, King (1346–1360)
Bagrat V, King (1360–1393)
George VII, King (1393–1407)

Eastern Georgia (complete list) –
David VIII, King (1292–1302, 1308–1311) 
Vakhtang III, King (1302–1308) 
George VI, King (1311–1313)
George V, King (1299–1302, 1314–1346)

Kingdom of Imereti (complete list) –
Constantine I, King (1293–1326)
Michael, King (1326–1329)
Bagrat I, King (1329–1330)
Alexandre I, King (1387–1389)
George I, King (1389–1396)
Constantine II, King (1396–1401)

Oceania

Chile: Easter Island

Easter Island (complete list) –
Te Tuhunga Hanui, King (?)
Te Tuhunga Haroa, King (?)
Te Tuhunga "Mare Kapeau", King (?)
Toati Rangi Hahe, King (?)
Tangaroa Tatarara, King (?)
Havini(vini) Koro (or Hariui Koro), King (c.1400)

Tonga

Tuʻi Tonga Empire (complete list) –
Tuʻitonga Puipui, King (?)
Havea I, King (?)
Tatafuʻeikimeimuʻa, King (?)
Lomiʻaetupuʻa, King (?)

United States: Hawaii

Island of Hawaiʻi (complete list) –
Kahaʻimaoeleʻa, supreme high chief (1285–1315)
Kalaunuiohua, supreme high chief (1315–1345)
Kūʻaiwa, supreme high chief (1345–1375)
Kahoukapu, supreme high chief (1375–1405)

See also
 List of state leaders in the 14th-century Holy Roman Empire

References 

14th century
 
-